Donald Wayne Zimmerman (born April 6, 1931) is an American former politician who served in the Kansas State Senate and Kansas House of Representatives as a Republican  during the 1960s and 1970s. He was originally elected to the Kansas House in 1964, serving two consecutive terms (one in the 14th district and one in the 16th); after an absence from the state legislature, he served one term in the Kansas Senate from 1973 to 1976 before being succeeded by Democrat Frank Smith.

References

1931 births
Possibly living people
Republican Party Kansas state senators
Republican Party members of the Kansas House of Representatives
Kansas Republicans
20th-century American politicians
Politicians from Olathe, Kansas